Francesco Borrelli from the University of California, Berkeley, CA was named Fellow of the Institute of Electrical and Electronics Engineers (IEEE) in 2016 for contributions to the theory and application of model predictive control.

References

Fellow Members of the IEEE
Living people
Year of birth missing (living people)
Place of birth missing (living people)
University of California, Berkeley faculty